Two Sides of Peter Banks is the debut album by ex-Yes, Flash, and Syn guitarist Peter Banks. It features contributions from members of several progressive rock bands, including Genesis (Phil Collins and Steve Hackett), King Crimson (John Wetton) and Flash (Ray Bennett and Mike Hough). Banks had previously been the guitarist of Yes, before being replaced by Steve Howe, after being fired from Yes in 1970 he formed Flash which ran from 1971 till 1973.

Overview 
The album features a group of guest musicians, including Genesis' Phil Collins and Steve Hackett and King Crimson's John Wetton. The entire album was written and recorded with Netherlands guitarist Jan Akkerman (of Focus). The first six tracks make up a suite (early themes are recapitulated toward the end) ranging from acoustic duets ("Vision of the King") to full-blown instrumental progressive rock numbers ("Knights") that bear similarities with Steve Hackett's 1975 solo album, Voyage of the Acolyte. "Beyond the Loneliest Sea" was written by Akkerman, while "Stop That!" is an extended jam featuring Banks and Akkerman trading solos. The album is entirely instrumental with Banks primarily playing guitar and also playing synthesizers and electric piano.

Track listing 
Side A

Side B

Personnel 
Adapted from AllMusic.
 Peter Banks - electric and acoustic guitars, ARP synthesizer, Minimoog, fender rhodes piano, producer
 Jan Akkerman - electric guitar (A1, A4, A6, B2, B3) acoustic guitar (B1)
 Steve Hackett - electric guitar (A5)
 John Wetton (credited as John Whetton) - bass guitar (A5)
 Ray Bennett - bass guitar (A3, A4, A5, B2, B3)
 Mike Hough - drums (A3)
 Phil Collins - drums (A4, A5, B2, B3)
 Geoff Young - engineer
 Paul Northfield - assistant engineer
 Ben Nisbet - management
 Mark Powell - remastering coordination, research
 Phil Smee - package design
 Ben Wiseman - digital remastering

Reference

External links

1973 debut albums